Holmbergiana is a genus of harvestmen in the family Sclerosomatidae from South America.

Species
 Holmbergiana orientalis Ringuelet, 1963
 Holmbergiana tibialis Ringuelet, 1960
 Holmbergiana weyenberghii (Holmberg, 1876)

References

Harvestmen
Harvestman genera